Gerardo Teissonnière (born March 29, 1961 in Ponce, Puerto Rico) is a  Puerto Rican pianist and teacher.

Education

Gerardo Teissonnière studied at the Conservatory of Music in Puerto Rico with Jesús María Sanromá and at the Cleveland Institute of Music with Vitya Vronsky (Vronsky & Babin), both disciples of Artur Schnabel and Alfred Cortot, and at the Aspen Music Festival with Jeaneane Dowis, former assistant to Rosina Lhévinne at the Juilliard School. He also pursued post-graduate studies in Europe with Dmitri Bashkirov and Joaquín Achúcarro.

Professional career

Since his American debut at the National Gallery of Art in Washington, D.C., Gerardo Teissonnière has given première performances of music by 20th-century composers such as Pablo Casals, Aaron Copland, Claude Debussy, Alberto Ginastera, Lowell Liebermann, Darius Milhaud, Arvo Pärt and Heitor Villa-Lobos. In 2004 he embarked on a five-recital cycle presenting the complete Mozart piano sonatas. In 2005 he was invited to perform in Poland in conjunction with commemorative events of the 150th anniversary of Chopin's death and the fifteenth Chopin International Piano Competition.  Teissonniere has recorded for the Steinway & Sons label and is a Steinway Artist and faculty member of the Cleveland Institute of Music.

Awards and honors

Gerardo Teissonnière is a recipient of the Arthur Loesser Memorial Award and the 2008 Alumni Achievement Award from the Cleveland Institute of Music. In 2008 he was awarded the Judson Smart Living Award in Education. He has also been nominated for the Ohio Arts Council's Governors' Award for the Arts.

See also

 List of Puerto Ricans
 Corsican immigration to Puerto Rico

References

Hispanic American Biographies. Danbury, Conn: Grolier, 2006

External links
Official site

1961 births
Living people
Musicians from Ponce
Puerto Rican classical pianists
Puerto Rican people of Corsican descent
Cleveland Institute of Music alumni
Cleveland Institute of Music faculty
21st-century classical pianists